Relay FM is a podcast network covering a diverse range of subjects including consumer technology, productivity, entrepreneurship, creativity, and art. It was founded 18 August 2014 by Myke Hurley and Stephen Hackett. The network's hosts include Christina Warren, Senior Cloud Developer Advocate at Microsoft; CGP Grey, educational YouTuber and co-host of the podcast Hello Internet; Simone de Rochefort, Senior Video Producer at Polygon; Casey Liss, Marco Arment, and John Siracusa from the Accidental Tech Podcast; Brianna Wu, cofounder of Giant Spacekat; and Jason Snell, former editorial director at Macworld, and owner of The Incomparable podcast network.

History
The network launched in 2014 with five podcasts: Analog(ue), Connected, Inquisitive, The Pen Addict, and Virtual. Eventually the company expanded to 31 active podcasts on the network (including the extra B-Sides podcast consisting of before and after podcast snippets and Departures, an audio feed of live events), nine paid members only podcasts, and 17 inactive podcasts.

On 9 October 2015, Relay FM launched its mobile application on iOS, allowing users to discover new podcasts, listen to the latest podcasts, and be notified when a podcast is broadcasting live. Users of the app can also subscribe to a podcast in their app of choice from the Relay FM app.

In September 2019, Relay FM became the first St. Jude Children's Research Hospital podcast partner. On the 20th, Hurley and Hackett hosted a 6 hour "podcastathon" to help raise money for the hospital. By the end of the month, the network had raised over $300,000. In September 2020 the network again held a fundraiser for St. Jude, bringing in $456,000.

Podcasts

Active

Paid "Members Only" Podcasts
In addition to the below "Members Only" podcasts, each podcast produces an Annual Special for members, eight (Automators, Clockwise, Connected, Cortex, Focused, Mac Power Users, Reconcilable Differences, and Upgrade) have paid versions that are ad-free and contain bonus content, and occasionally members will receive trial episodes for possible new podcasts.

Inactive

References

External links
 

American broadcasters
Podcasting companies